Polia rogenhoferi is a species of cutworm or dart moth in the family Noctuidae. It is found in North America.

The MONA or Hodges number for Polia rogenhoferi is 10277.

References

Further reading

 
 
 

Hadenini
Articles created by Qbugbot
Moths described in 1870